Jefferson County Jail is a national historic site located at 380 West Dogwood Street, Monticello, Florida in Jefferson County. The Masonry Vernacular building was constructed in 1909, with alterations in 1940 and 1960.

The design is typical for small jails of the early twentieth century: on the first floor there are the living quarters for the sheriff or deputy and his family, and on the second floor there are the steel cages for the inmates.

It was added to the National Register of Historic Places on January 15, 2014.

The building is under restoration and is now operated as the Monticello Old Jail Museum by Main Street of Monticello, Florida, Inc.

References

External links

 Monticello Old Jail Museum - Facebook site

National Register of Historic Places in Jefferson County, Florida
Museums in Jefferson County, Florida
Prisons on the National Register of Historic Places
Prison museums in Florida